Xindonga is an ethnological term created as a common label for four small ethnic groups existing in the extreme Southeast of Angola: the Cusso (Mbukushu), the Dilico (or Dirico), the Sambio and the Maxico. These peoples live in that region, which today is the Cuando Cubango Province, together with other small groups, belonging to the Ovambo, Ganguela and San. The "Xindonga" peoples are living on petty subsistence agriculture,  keeping small animals, and the occasional hunting and/or fishing.

References

Further reading 
 Maria Fisch, The Mbukushu in Angola (1970-2002): A History of Migration, Flight and Royal Rainmaking, Cologne: Rüdiger Köppe Verlag, 2005 

Ethnic groups in Angola